Ladislav Žák (born 21 April 1988) is a Slovak football forward who currently plays for Slovak side FC ViOn Zlaté Moravce.

Career
He made two appearances in the Slovak Corgoň liga, one for AS Trenčín and second for FC ViOn Zlaté Moravce.

External links
Corgoň Liga profile

References

1988 births
Living people
Association football forwards
Slovak footballers
AS Trenčín players
FC ViOn Zlaté Moravce players
Slovak Super Liga players